is a Japanese four-panel comic strip manga by Negi Banno about the lives of female teachers within a school at which they teach. The "Astro" in the title is actually an acronym abbreviating "Asahio Sogo Teacher's ROom", alluding to the school's name Asahio Sogo. The original title, Kyōkan Astro, plays on the fact that  is 'instructor' in Japanese, but the title uses the kanji  meaning 'warship' in place of  meaning 'government service'. The manga started serialization in Houbunsha's seinen manga magazine Manga Time Kirara Carat on February 24, 2005, and the first bound volume was released on February 27, 2007. However, the manga has not appeared in the magazine since November 28, 2007. Yen Press licensed the series for release in English, and released the first volume on August 12, 2008.

Plot
Set in the present, the story focuses on the exploits of first time teachers Izumi Maki and Yuko Nagumo as they begin their teaching jobs at the school they used to attend (Asahio Shogo). Other faculty members include Setsuna Arai, the school's nurse, and Kaname Karasuma, a veteran teacher.

Characters

Maki is a physical education teacher who is very relaxed and does not take her job very seriously, much to the irritation of some of the faculty. She is prone to taking naps even during school hours and enjoys playing video games and drinking to excess.

Nagumo is the Japanese teacher at her school, and dresses in a kimono for the class. She takes her duties far more seriously than Maki, and takes pride in tripping up and fooling her students (as she explains, if they fall for trick questions, they are not reading well enough). However, she is possibly more well known for being a glutton, bringing several bento to school, which she eats between every period, and is something of a fujoshi though she tries to hide it.

Arai is the nurse of the school. She is very no-nonsense when it comes to her work, violently ejecting any students (or teachers) who are not actually ill. She frequently plays hand held video games in her office when patients are few and far between. She is somewhat infamous for being something of a sadist, grinning happily at the sight of blood, and speaks almost gleefully at the prospect of injuries at a sports event. Arai has a love–hate relationship with Maki's brother, Itsuki, giving her characteristics of a tsundere.

Karasuma teaches English and French and is the back-up homeroom teacher to Maki, whom she is in love with. She carries a camera specifically for taking photos of her whenever the chance arises, and frequently attempts to get closer to her, but is almost inevitably shot down. Maki appears oblivious to Karasuma's feelings.

External links
S.S. Astro at Yen Press

2005 manga
Houbunsha manga
School life in anime and manga
Seinen manga
Yen Press titles
Yonkoma